Clarence Center is a affluent hamlet and census-designated place (CDP) in the town of Clarence in Erie County, New York, United States. The population was 2,257 at the 2010 census. It is part of the Buffalo–Niagara Falls Metropolitan Statistical Area.

Clarence Center, within the south-central part of the town, is the location of most of the town government facilities, although the actual town hall is within the Clarence postal zone.

Clarence Center is also one of the postal zones in the town with a ZIP code of 14032. This area comprises most of the northern part of the town.

History 
The community was founded in 1823 as Van Tines Corners.
The community was the first in the town of Clarence to have access to a rail line, with the "Peanut" line being pulled through the community in 1853, the station was named "Clarence Center," Railroad service was cut off on December 31, 1977, and today the line has been mostly ripped up, replaced by a cycling trail, referred to as the "Peanut" line, an homage to the original "Peanut" line, on which rail came to the community.

Colgan Air Flight 3407 crash 

On February 12, 2009 at 10:20 pm, a Continental Connection flight operated by Colgan Air went down in Clarence Center, killing all 44 passengers and five crew members, along with one resident on the ground whose house the plane impacted. The plane, a Bombardier Dash 8 Q400 74-seat turboprop, had logged only 1819 hours, having been delivered in 2008. Up to a week after the crash, the entire neighborhood was closed off because of the numerous residents wanting to see the crash site.

Geography
Clarence Center is located at  (43.011158, -78.634749).

As suggested by its name, Clarence Center lies near the middle of the town.

Demographics

As of the census of 2000, there were 1,747 people, 622 households, and 508 families residing in the hamlet. The population density was 822.5 per square mile (318.2/km2). There were 634 housing units at an average density of 298.5/sq mi (115.5/km2). The racial makeup of the CDP was 98.28% White, 0.52% African American, 0.17% Native American, 0.17% Asian, 0.11% Pacific Islander, 0.29% from other races, and 0.46% from two or more races. Hispanic or Latino of any race were 0.97% of the population.

There were 622 households, out of which 41.0% had children under the age of 18 living with them, 69.9% were married couples living together, 9.2% had a female householder with no husband present, and 18.2% were non-families. 14.6% of all households were made up of individuals, and 7.1% had someone living alone who was 65 years of age or older. The average household size was 2.81 and the average family size was 3.13.

In the community, the population was spread out, with 28.6% under the age of 18, 6.4% from 18 to 24, 29.8% from 25 to 44, 21.5% from 45 to 64, and 13.7% who were 65 years of age or older. The median age was 37 years. For every 100 females, there were 95.6 males. For every 100 females age 18 and over, there were 88.5 males.

The median income for a household in the hamlet was $66,311, and the median income for a family was $70,179. Males had a median income of $53,542 versus $27,266 for females. The per capita income for the CDP was $25,363. About 1.7% of families and 1.0% of the population were below the poverty line, including none of those under age 18 and 6.3% of those age 65 or over.

Characteristics 
The heart of the community is the more heavily settled area by the intersection of Clarence Center and Goodrich Roads. This location is sometimes referred to as "the four corners" or merely "the corners". There is a business on each corner, currently a coffee shop, a bank, a day care center, and a small cluster of gift shops.

East of the four corners is the Clarence Center Elementary School, which serves most of the northern part of the town.

Although Clarence Center occupies most of the northern part of the town, the population is less than the part of the town that is called Clarence.

A hiking/biking trail connects Clarence Center to Akron, New York, to the east and to NY Route 78, Transit Road, to the west.

The J. Eshelman and Company Store at 6000 Goodrich Rd., was listed on the National Register of Historic Places in 1982.

Notable people
Dancer Neil Haskell is a Clarence Center native. He is an original cast member of the Broadway musical  Hamilton: An American Musical.

Retired National Hockey League player Marcel Dionne has a residence in Clarence Center.

References

External links
  Information about Clarence Center Elementary School

Hamlets in New York (state)
Census-designated places in New York (state)
Buffalo–Niagara Falls metropolitan area
Census-designated places in Erie County, New York
Hamlets in Erie County, New York